Travis David Wilson (born 10 July 1977 in Christchurch, New Zealand) is a current member of the Black Socks, New Zealand's national softball. He first played for the Black Socks in 1994 and was an integral part of their ISF Men's World Championship winning team in Midland, Michigan in 1996.

Following this tournament Wilson was scouted by the Atlanta Braves where he played for seven seasons, most of which were spent at the Triple-A level. He was a multiple Minor League All-Star and was put on the Braves 40-man roster after leading the Arizona Fall League in hitting in 2001. Wilson finished his baseball career in 2004 with a season in the Cincinnati Reds farm system.

From 2002 through 2004, Wilson also played three seasons of winter ball for the Tiburones de La Guaira and Leones del Caracas clubs of the Venezuelan Professional Baseball League.

In 2005 Wilson returned to New Zealand where he worked for three years with the New Zealand national cricket team as their Specialist Fielding Coach and Video Analyst. He is currently an assistant coach for the Florida State University Seminoles Softball team.

In 2022, Wilson was inducted into the International Softball Congress Hall of Fame.

Sources

External links

New Zealand Herald article, 30 September 2005
New Zealand Herald article, 22 November 2005

1977 births
Living people
Chattanooga Lookouts players
Danville Braves players
Greenville Braves players
Leones del Caracas players
Expatriate baseball players in Venezuela
Macon Braves players
Myrtle Beach Pelicans players
New Zealand expatriate baseball players in the United States
New Zealand softball players
Richmond Braves players
Sportspeople from Christchurch
Tiburones de La Guaira players